Carlos de Melo Bittencourt Filho (18 March 1930 – 12 October 2010) was a Brazilian Olympic sailor in the Star class. He competed in the 1948 Summer Olympics, where he finished 14th together with João José Bracony.

References

External links
 

Olympic sailors of Brazil
Brazilian male sailors (sport)
Star class sailors
Sailors at the 1948 Summer Olympics – Star
1930 births
2010 deaths